Audionom is a krautrock and space rock band from Sweden.

History
Audionom is a Stockholm supergroup that quickly became a popular live act known for its abrasive shows that also integrated the films of member Martin Malm. The bands hypnotic pummeling sound took inspiration from their love for such early experimental visionaries as Hawkwind, Einstürzende Neubauten and Neu!

Audionom was formed in 1999 by members of two local Stockholm bands, Apparat and PVC. They released a number of tapes and singles for Swedish labels between 1999 and 2002, which were collected onto a full-length album entitled Retrospektiv, released in 2005. The group broke up before Kemado Records heard it and offered to release it in the United States. Kemado's reissue came out early in 2007. The band reunited in 2007 released a new album - entitled 'Superior' - on Ideal Recordings on February 26, 2009.

A new single "Europa" was released in December 2013 and the LP "Total" in spring 2014 on Gone Beyond Records.

Related existing or non existing bands with members from past or today Audionom include: 1999, Fé, Appareil, Tvillingarna, Intergalactica, The Tourettes, Sibille Attar, Nova Express, The Vectors, Paper, Scumbrigade, Seamonster1, Kite, and Urkona.

Discography
 Audionom (2001), 7" on Truckfighter Recordings and Beauty Resources
 Audionom / Sickoakes - Split LP (2002), LP on Mothertrucker Records
 Retrospektiv (2005), CD on iDEAL Recordings and Kemado Records
 Audionom I (2006), DVD on Filmkransen]
 Superior (2009), CD on iDEAL Recordings
 Inferior 1 (2009), 7" on Du & Jag + Åskar Brickman
 Inferior 2 (2010), 7" on Du & Jag + Åskar Brickman
 Inferior 3 (2010), 7" on Du & Jag + Åskar Brickman
 Europa (2013), 7" on Gone Beyond Records
 Total (2014), LP on Gone Beyond Records

Members

Current members

 Johan Hinders - synth, vocals (1999–present)
 Paul Sigerhall - drums (1999–present)
 Martin Malm - visuals (1999–present)
 Henrik Hannebo - synth (1999–2001, 2004–2005, 2007–2014)
 Mårten Holmberg - guitar (2004–2005, 2007–present)
 Andreas Bergman - guitar (2004–2005, 2007-present)
 Pelle Backman - bass, backing vocals (2007–present)

Former members

 Peter Backebo - guitar, backing vocals (1999–2002)
 Koffe Berger - vocals (1999–2000, 2004–2005)
 Christian Berg - bass (2001–2002, 2004–2005)
 Peter Jidling - bass (1999–2001)
 Tomas Kanerva - fx (2000–2002)
 Mats Björk - synth (2001–2002)
 Henrik Levander - drums (1999–2000)
 Aurelia Le Huche - percussion (2004–2005).

References

Swedish indie rock groups